Thomas Baines (1806–1881), was an English journalist and historian.

Biography
Baines was born at Leeds in 1806, the third son of Edward Baines, M.P.

In 1829 he settled in Liverpool acting editor of the Liverpool Times newspaper; having acquired the paper as the Billinge's Advertiser; the paper closed in 1858 due to competition from cheap dailys. After 1858 he became secretary of the Liverpool's office in London, as an employee of the city's corporation.

For thirty years was an active promoter of liberal interests in Lancashire. In 1852 he published a valuable history of the commerce and town of Liverpool, and in 1867 Lancashire and Cheshire Past and Present, having in 1859 settled in London at the Liverpool Office as a parliamentary agent. His last work, Yorkshire Past and Present, was published in 1871; Two minor books of his were Agricultural Resources of Great Britain and the Colonies, and Observations on the River Plate. His county histories are characterised by fullness of details, clearness of statement, and orderly arrangement.

On 31 October 1881, he died at Seaforth Hall, near Liverpool, the residence of his son-in-law Edmund Knowles Muspratt.

Family
In 1836 Baines married Fanny Higgins (1815–1856), daughter of Vincent Higgins (1789–1854) an iron merchant and his first wife Mary Anne née Wall (c1792–1836). Thomas and Fanny had seven children, of which six survived him. Two of his daughters married prominent Liverpool figures: 
 Frances Jane Baines (1840–1910) married Edmund Knowles Muspratt and
 Mary Anne Eliza Baines (1842–1928) was the second wife of Arthur Bower Forwood.

Works

, in several parts

References

Sources

External links
 

1806 births
1881 deaths
19th-century British journalists
19th-century British historians
English male journalists
Writers from Leeds
19th-century English male writers
English local historians